Danaë  (minor planet designation: 61 Danaë) is a stony (S-type) asteroid in the outer asteroid belt's background population, approximately 84 kilometer in diameter. It was discovered by French astronomer Hermann Goldschmidt on 9 September 1860, from his balcony in Paris, France. Goldschmidt was ill when asked to name the asteroid, and requested his fellow asteroid-hunter Robert Luther to name it instead. Luther chose to name it after Danaë, the mother of Perseus in Greek mythology. Danaë was the first asteroid to have a diacritical character in its official name.

The asteroid is orbiting the Sun with a period of 5.15 years and is rotating on its axis once every 11.45 hours. In 1985, a study of lightcurve data suggested that Danaë may have a moon. The density of both would be .

References 
 

 Alberto Cellino, Renato Pannunzio, Vincenzo Zappalà, Paolo Farinella, and Paolo Paolicchi, 1985, Do we observe light curves of binary asteroids?, Astronomy and Astrophysics, Vol. 144, No. 2, pp. 355–362.

External links 
 Asteroid Lightcurve Database (LCDB), query form (info )
 Dictionary of Minor Planet Names, Google books
 Asteroids and comets rotation curves, CdR – Observatoire de Genève, Raoul Behrend
 Discovery Circumstances: Numbered Minor Planets (1)-(5000) – Minor Planet Center
 
 

000061
000061
000061
Discoveries by Hermann Goldschmidt
Named minor planets
18600909